Beyçayırı can refer to:

 Beyçayırı, Beşiri
 Beyçayırı, Lapseki